Daadagiri is a 1997 Indian Hindi-language action film directed by Arshad Khan starring Mithun Chakraborty, Ayub Khan, Simran, Rituparna Sengupta and Puneet Issar in lead roles.

Plot
Ajay and Amar Saxena were separated from their sister Uma and their father at a young age. Now grown up, they are con men, and on the look out for Dhanraj and Jagraj who they suspect killed their father and sister.

Cast
Mithun Chakraborty as Ajay Saxena
Ayub Khan as Amar Saxena
Rituparna Sengupta as Asha Verma
Simran as Uma
Aasif Sheikh as Monty	
Nishigandha Wad as Radha Sinha
Shakti Kapoor as ACP Pratap Sinha
Kader Khan as Dinanath
Puneet Issar as Dhanraj
Ranjeet as Marshal
Raza Murad as Jagraj
Yunus Parvez as Mamaji
Himani Shivpuri as Mrs. Sinha
Tej Sapru as Rangeela Ratan	
Suresh Chatwal as Mayor

Music
Songs were written by Nawab Arzoo. 
"Tirchi Nazaria Gore Gaal" - Udit Narayan, Kavita Krishnamurthy
"Gore Rang Ka Zamana" - Udit Narayan, Asha Bhosle
"Mujhe Yaara Tere Pyar Mein" - Kumar Sanu, Kavita Krishnamurthy
"Maine Jise Chaha" - Kavita Krishnamurthy
"Yeh Bandhan Hai Purana" - Kavita Krishnamurthy, Babul Supriyo, Nirja Pandit
"Maine Tujhe Chaaha" - Mohammed Aziz, Kavita Krishnamurthy

References

External links

1990s Hindi-language films
1997 films
Mithun's Dream Factory films
Films shot in Ooty
Films scored by Dilip Sen-Sameer Sen
Indian action films